Calum Neill is Associate Professor of Psychoanalysis and Cultural Theory at Edinburgh Napier University in Edinburgh, Scotland. He is editor of the Palgrave Lacan Series and the author of Without Ground: Lacanian Ethics and the Assumption of Subjectivity and Ethics and Psychology: Beyond Codes of Practice. Along with Derek Hook and Stijn Vanhuele, he edited the four volumes of Reading Lacan's Ecrits.

References

Year of birth missing (living people)
Living people
Scottish psychologists